The Great Southern and Western Railway (GS&WR) Class 37 consisted of six 4-4-2T tank engines. The first two built by locomotive superintendent Henry Ivatt (Snr.) were based on a previous 2-4-0T design by McDonnell, as were some 2-4-2Ts Ivatt produced two years earlier for the Kerry branches.

Construction
In 1900 Robert Coey, who by then had been promoted Inchicore Railway Works Manager to locomotive superintendent, produced four of a heavier and more powerful , these were known as Class 27.

Robert Coey in 1902 produced four more of the lighter class built by Ivatt, these were to be the final passenger tanks built by the GS&WR.

Design
The Class 37 had a very low  maximum axle load enabling a very high route availability.  By contrast the Class 27 had a higher  maximum axle load .

Service

By the 1930s most have been allocated to the Cork local services.

By 1948 the type was regarded as obsolete but all lasted until the 1950s with the last withdrawn in 1955.

References

4-4-2T locomotives
5 ft 3 in gauge locomotives
Railway locomotives introduced in 1894
Steam locomotives of Ireland
Scrapped locomotives